General elections were held in Gibraltar on 17 October 2019 to elect all 17 members to the fourth Gibraltar Parliament. Chief Minister Fabian Picardo announced the date of the election on Monday 16 September 2019.

The GSLP–Liberal Alliance won their third consecutive election, retaining their majority in the Parliament. Fabian Picardo was returned as Chief Minister of Gibraltar. However both the governing GSLP–Liberal Alliance and the opposition Gibraltar Social Democrats lost votes to new party Together Gibraltar, which won one seat from the GSD.

Timing and procedure
Under section 38(2) of the Gibraltar Constitution Order 2006, the parliament must be dissolved four years after its first meeting following the last election (unless the Chief Minister advises the Governor of Gibraltar to dissolve parliament sooner). Under section 37 of the Constitution, writs for a general election must be issued within thirty days of the dissolution and the general election must then be held no later than three months after the issuing of a writ. In September 2019, Chief Minister Fabian Picardo formally asked Governor Ed Davis to dissolve parliament and call an election for 17 October 2019. Following the British tradition, elections in Gibraltar conventionally take place on a Thursday.

MPs were elected through limited voting.

Campaign
The issue of Brexit (formerly due to take place exactly two weeks after election day) was a major theme in the election campaign, with incumbent Chief Minister Fabian Picardo stating that the territory is ready for a 'no deal' Brexit.

Results

By candidate

References

Gibraltar
General
General elections in Gibraltar
Gibraltar